Marcos Daniel (born 1 August 1961) is an Angolan swimmer. He competed in two events at the 1980 Summer Olympics.

References

External links
 

1961 births
Living people
Angolan male swimmers
Olympic swimmers of Angola
Swimmers at the 1980 Summer Olympics
Place of birth missing (living people)